Guillermo Ignacio Cañas (born November 25, 1977), often referred to as Willy Cañas, is a retired tennis player from Argentina. He was born in Buenos Aires and named after Argentine tennis star Guillermo Vilas. Cañas won the Canada Masters in 2002, and reached the quarterfinal stage of the French Open in 2002, 2005 and 2007. His career-high singles ranking was world No. 8, achieved in June 2005. After being suspended in August 2005, Cañas returned to the circuit in September 2006 at ATP Challenger level.

Career

Early years
Cañas started playing at age 7. He turned professional in 1995, and began playing on the juniors circuit, enjoying some successes; these included a runner-up appearance at Surbiton, United Kingdom, and a win in the doubles event at the Italian Junior Championships, partnering Martín García.

From 1995–1999, Cañas played mainly Challenger Series tournaments, that is, the level of competition directly below that of the ATP Tour. In April 1998, he broke into the top 100 for the first time, having won three Challenger tournaments in the previous 52 weeks. This allowed him to qualify for more ATP level tournaments, and he reached his first final in 1999 at Orlando, Florida. He also began to regularly qualify for Grand Slam tournaments, the most prestigious events in tennis.

In 2001, after a right wrist injury the previous year, he climbed from 227th place in the ATP rankings to the 15th, and was named ATP Comeback Player of Year. Cañas had won the first ATP level title of his career that season, in Casablanca, and reached the final of three other tournaments. In addition to this, he reached the fourth round of a Grand Slam tournament for the first time, achieving this result on two occasions, at the French Open and Wimbledon.

In the 2002 ATP Masters Series of Canada, an unseeded Cañas won his first ATP Masters Series title in Toronto, defeating Andy Roddick 6–4, 7–5 in the final. Cañas's path to the final saw him defeat a renowned set of players, including world number two Marat Safin, and top-ten ranked Yevgeny Kafelnikov and Roger Federer. Cañas was also the first Argentine to win the Canada Open since Guillermo Vilas in 1976 and the first to win a Masters Series shield (the Series was created in 1990). Cañas won one other tournament in 2002, the Chennai Open, and reached in the finals in Casablanca and Stuttgart. He also emerged as a more potent force at the Grand Slams as he reached his first quarterfinal at the French.

Doping
On August 8, 2005, Cañas was suspended for two years and was forced to forfeit $276,070 in prizes by the ATP after testing positive for a diuretic called hydrochlorothiazide, a substance with no benefits in itself other than as a treatment for hypertension, but used to cover other forbidden substances. No traces of any other forbidden substance were found in Cañas's sample, and the player asserts the diuretic was present in some medicine prescribed by ATP doctors Mercader and Chinchilla for a cold he contracted during the Acapulco tournament in Mexico. Just a few weeks before his ban started, Cañas had been at the highest ranking of his career, world number eight.

Cañas vowed to fight the ban, claiming he was innocent of the charges against him. Cañas took his case to the Court of Arbitration for Sport. His perseverance paid off on May 23, 2006, when he was acquitted of deliberate performance enhancement through illegal substances because the substances were in a prescription medicine. He was, however, considered careless in not checking the medicine before ingesting it. He was allowed to return to full professional activity from September 11, 2006, and the money prizes acquired before the suspension was restored. His points, which determine a player's ranking, were nil upon his return, having expired.

Return
Upon his return to the tour, Cañas won five Challenger titles and one ATP title (2007 Brasil Open). In the six months after his return, he had won 42 of 47 matches, going from being unranked to rank 60. He won his first ATP-level match since his September return on February 15, 2007, beating Marcos Daniel 6–1, 6–4.

On March 11, 2007, Cañas defeated ATP ranked number one Roger Federer 7–5, 6–2 at the Indian Wells Masters, ending Federer's streak of 41 consecutive victories, 5 short of Guillermo Vilas's record on ATP Tour matches. He defeated Federer again (7–6, 2–6, 7–6) 16 days later at the Miami Masters to back-up his victory at Indian Wells. This double victory made him the only player (besides Rafael Nadal) to have defeated Federer in consecutive tournaments since 2003. Cañas told the New York Times that "I came back very motivated, I came back with a lot of energy."

Cañas became the first qualifier to reach the semifinals of the Miami Masters. He made the final by beating Ivan Ljubičić, the seventh seed, 7–5, 6–2. In the final, the Argentine lost to Novak Djokovic of Serbia in straight sets. To get to the final, Cañas defeated Tim Henman, Juan Carlos Ferrero, Richard Gasquet, Roger Federer, Tommy Robredo, and Ivan Ljubičić, respectively, before losing to Novak Djoković. Cañas jumped 121 positions to reach the 22nd place in the ATP ranking as of April 30, 2007, the highest jump so far in the year.

Cañas reached the final of one more tournament in 2007, the Torneo Godó in Barcelona, where he lost to Rafael Nadal. Cañas commented afterwards that he believed he would be a strong contender at the French Open. However, his bid was thwarted for a third time at the quarter-final stage when he lost to Nikolay Davydenko. Having set himself a goal of finishing in the top 20, Cañas finished the year in 15th, equalling his finishes from 2001 and 2002. He announced his retirement from professional tennis in March 2010. Cañas held a record of five victories and two defeats (3–1 in singles) in Davis Cup matches across his career.

Post-retirement
Cañas was the coach of Ernests Gulbis from July 2011 until May 2012 and became the coach of Teymuraz Gabashvili in 2015. He coached former #1 Jelena Jankovic from January 2017 until her retirement. He is the current coach of Bernarda Pera. He now runs his own tennis academy in Aventura, Florida along with former tour pros Martín García, and Gustavo Oribe.

Playing style
Cañas played a defensive counter-punching game from the baseline, using his retrieving skills in order to frustrate opponents. He used a double-handed backhand.

Significant finals

Masters 1000 finals

Singles: 2 (1 titles, 1 runner-ups)

Career finals

Singles: 16 (7 titles, 9 runner-ups)

Doubles: 2 (2 titles)

Career ATP Challenger finals

Singles: 15 (11–4)
Wins (11)

Runner-ups (4)

Doubles
Wins (5)

Performance timeline

Singles

Top 10 wins

See also
 List of sportspeople sanctioned for doping offences

References

External links

 
 
 

Argentine male tennis players
Argentine sportspeople in doping cases
Doping cases in tennis
Olympic tennis players of Argentina
People from La Matanza Partido
Tennis players from Buenos Aires
Tennis players at the 2008 Summer Olympics
1977 births
Living people